Jacynthe Millette-Bilodeau (born September 13, 1979) is a Canadian pop singer who records as Jacynthe. She records material in English, French and Italian, and has had Top 40 hits on both the anglophone and francophone pop charts in Canada. She lives in Montreal. As of 2020, she has retired her from her career in entertainment and now is an English second language teacher as well as budding politician in her community of Laval, Quebec.

Jacynthe is best known amongst adults for starring, along with Anne-Marie Losique, in the Québécois version of the reality show The Simple Life, called La Vie Rurale.

In 2006 she toured with the Cirque du Soleil in their very first arena tour, Delirium. She left the show in May. She appears on the show's album, which was released in June 2006.

In 2011, Jacynthe released her fifth studio album, Dévoile qui tu es, her first in eight years. She is now in studio to record her follow-up English album.

In 2012, her song "Feel" featuring Victoria Duffield peaked at No. 1 on the Tops 25 Radio BDS Francophone.

In May 2021, Jacynthe has been a running candidate for Quebec political faction, Action Laval running under her political campaign associate and party leader, Sophie Trottier.

Jacynthe is married to her husband, Carlo, and they have a daughter.

Discography

References

External links 

1979 births
Canadian dance musicians
French-language singers of Canada
French Quebecers
Living people
Musicians from Quebec City
Canadian women pop singers
21st-century Canadian women singers